Roberto Tamassia is an American Italian computer scientist, the Plastech Professor of Computer Science at Brown University, and served as the chair of the Brown Computer Science department from 2007 to 2014. His research specialty is in the design and analysis of algorithms for graph drawing, computational geometry, and computer security; he is also the author of several textbooks.

Professional biography
Tamassia received a laurea (the Italian equivalent of an M.S. degree) from the University of Rome "La Sapienza" in 1984, and a Ph.D. from the University of Illinois at Urbana-Champaign under the supervision of Franco Preparata in 1988. He then took a faculty position at Brown; he has also held visiting positions at the University of Texas at Dallas, the Consiglio Nazionale delle Ricerche, and La Sapienza.

Tamassia is an ISI highly cited researcher. He was one of the original organizers of the International Symposium on Graph Drawing, and was co-chair of that conference in 1994; he has also been co-chair of the semiannual Workshop on Algorithms and Data Structures (1997, 1999, and 2001) and the annual Workshop on Algorithms and Experiments (2005). He is founding editor-in-chief (since 1996) of the Journal of Graph Algorithms and Applications as well as belonging to several other journal editorial boards.

Awards and honors
In 2006, the IEEE Computer Society gave Tamassia their Technical Achievement Award "for pioneering the field of graph drawing and for outstanding contributions to the design of graph and geometric algorithms." In 2008, he was elected as an IEEE Fellow. In 2012 he was named a fellow of the Association for Computing Machinery "for contributions to graph drawing, algorithms and data structures and to computer science education", and also named a fellow of the American Association for the Advancement of Science.

Books
. Fourth edition, 2005.
.
.

References

External links
Tamassia's home page at Brown.

Year of birth missing (living people)
Living people
American computer scientists
Italian computer scientists
University of Illinois Urbana-Champaign alumni
Brown University faculty
Researchers in geometric algorithms
Graph drawing people
Computer security academics
Fellow Members of the IEEE
Fellows of the American Association for the Advancement of Science
Fellows of the Association for Computing Machinery
20th-century Italian scientists
21st-century Italian scientists
20th-century American scientists
21st-century American scientists
National Research Council (Italy) people